Stumptown is an unincorporated community in Gilmer County, West Virginia, United States, at the confluence of the left and right forks of Steer Creek. It was named for Michael Stump III, a pioneer settler.  It lies at an elevation of 725 feet (221 m). The Stumptown Post Office opened May 29, 1883 and closed February 1, 1997.

See also
Stumptown Wildlife Management Area
The Shack Neighborhood House

References

Unincorporated communities in West Virginia
Unincorporated communities in Gilmer County, West Virginia